Jerseytown is a census-designated place (CDP) in Madison Township, Columbia County, Pennsylvania, United States. It is part of Northeastern Pennsylvania. The population was 184 at the 2010 census. It is part of the Bloomsburg-Berwick micropolitan area.

History
The land of the Jerseytown area was first bought by the Welliver family in 1785, after the Revolutionary War. A tannery was built in Jerseytown in 1826. The area continues to be rural and lightly populated.

Geography

Jerseytown is located in western Columbia County at  (41.087459, -76.581405), near the center of Madison Township.

Jerseytown is served by state routes 44 and 254. PA 44 leads northeast  to Millville and southwest  to Milton. PA 254 leads southeast  to Bloomsburg, the Columbia County seat, and northwest/west  to Turbotville. Jerseytown is mostly farmland with some forest.

Demographics

As of the census of 2000, there were 150 people, 50 households, and 42 families residing in the CDP. The population density was 127.9 people per square mile (49.5/km). There were 55 housing units at an average density of 46.9/sq mi (18.2/km). The racial makeup of the CDP was 99.33% White and 0.67% Native American. Hispanic or Latino of any race were 0.67% of the population.

There were 50 households, out of which 28.0% had children under the age of 18 living with them, 82.0% were married couples living together, 2.0% had a female householder with no husband present, and 16.0% were non-families. 10.0% of all households were made up of individuals, and 4.0% had someone living alone who was 65 years of age or older. The average household size was 2.88 and the average family size was 2.83.

In the CDP, the population was spread out, with 16.7% under the age of 18, 4.7% from 18 to 24, 24.0% from 25 to 44, 35.3% from 45 to 64, and 19.3% who were 65 years of age or older. The median age was 46 years. For every 100 females, there were 92.3 males. For every 100 females age 18 and over, there were 83.8 males.

The median income for a household in the CDP was $45,625, and the median income for a family was $46,250. Males had a median income of $29,107 versus $22,500 for females. The per capita income for the CDP was $20,538. None of the families and 1.7% of the population were living below the poverty line, including no under eighteens and 6.3% of those over 64.

References

External links

Bloomsburg–Berwick metropolitan area
Census-designated places in Columbia County, Pennsylvania
Census-designated places in Pennsylvania